Scott Johns is the former editor of magicthegathering.com, and a former Magic: The Gathering Pro player. During his playing career he reached the top eight of a Pro Tour five times including his very first Pro Tour, and  won Pro Tour New York 2000 with Gary Wise and Mike Turian as a part of Potato Nation.

Achievements

Other accomplishments 

 Johns won the Type I (Vintage) division of PT Dallas 1996

References

American Magic: The Gathering players
Living people
Year of birth missing (living people)